The Doll Doctor is a 1916 American short silent drama film, directed by Jack Harvey. It stars Harry Benham, Violet Mersereau, and Jack Lewis.

References

External links
The Doll Doctor at the Internet Movie Database

1916 films
American silent short films
American black-and-white films
Silent American drama films
1916 drama films
Films directed by Jack Harvey
1916 short films
1910s American films